Sardorbek Dusmurotov (born 13 March 1993) is an Uzbekistani weightlifter.

He competed at the 2016 Summer Olympics in Rio de Janeiro, in the men's +105 kg.

References

1993 births
Living people
Uzbekistani male weightlifters
Olympic weightlifters of Uzbekistan
Weightlifters at the 2016 Summer Olympics
Weightlifters at the 2014 Asian Games
Asian Games medalists in weightlifting
Asian Games bronze medalists for Uzbekistan
Medalists at the 2014 Asian Games
20th-century Uzbekistani people
21st-century Uzbekistani people